Acidihalobacter is a bacterial genus from the family of Ectothiorhodospiraceae.'

References

Further reading 
 

Chromatiales
Bacteria genera